Ware's Tavern is a historic tavern (now a private residence) in Sherborn, Massachusetts.  The two story wood-frame structure was built c. 1780 by Benjamin Ware as a house for his family.  It has a centered entry that is now sheltered by a Colonial Revival (early 20th century)  surround.  Ware's son Eleazer converted the building into a tavern; it was greatly enlarged with an ell to the rear c. 1840.  The building ceased to be used as a tavern by 1889; an ell was removed sometime in the 19th century, and now stands at 109 S. Main Street.

The tavern was listed on the National Register of Historic Places in 1986.

See also
National Register of Historic Places listings in Sherborn, Massachusetts

References

Drinking establishments on the National Register of Historic Places in Massachusetts
Houses on the National Register of Historic Places in Middlesex County, Massachusetts
Houses in Sherborn, Massachusetts